Country Evolution is the seventh studio album by the American a cappella band Home Free and third with their current lineup. It was released on September 18, 2015, with pre-orders being made available on August 21. The album includes five original songs and nine covers, including collaborations with The Oak Ridge Boys, Charlie Daniels, and Taylor Davis.

Commercial performance

The album debuted at No. 4 on the Top Country Albums chart, and No. 48 on the Billboard 200, selling 9,700 copies in its debut week in the US.  The album has sold 63,200 copies in the US as of April 2017.

Track listing

Personnel 
 Austin Brown - tenor lead and backing vocals
 Rob Lundquist - tenor lead and backing vocals
 Chris Rupp - baritone lead and backing vocals, bass backing vocals
 Tim Foust - vocal bass, bass lead and backing vocals, baritone and tenor lead vocals
  Adam Rupp - vocal percussion, beatboxing, backing vocals

On parts of some songs Tim Foust would briefly move from bass to either baritone or tenor and Chris Rupp would take his place, both live and in the studio.

Charts

References

2015 albums
Home Free (group) albums
Columbia Records albums